Mieroszów  is a town in Wałbrzych County, Lower Silesian Voivodeship, in south-western Poland, near the border with the Czech Republic. It is the seat of the administrative district (gmina) called Gmina Mieroszów.

As of 2019, the town has a population of 4,070.

Sport
Mieroszów is known for the Jatki mountain (also called the New Saddle) which has a perfectly profiled hang-glider and paraglider launching slope for south winds. This is an easy training slope with a hang-glider ramp, but experienced pilots have done some long unpowered flights from the site.

Twin towns – sister cities
See twin towns of Gmina Mieroszów.

Notable people
 Fedor Krause (1857–1937), German neurosurgeon

References

External links
 Jewish Community in Mieroszów on Virtual Shtetl

Cities and towns in Lower Silesian Voivodeship
Wałbrzych County
Cities in Silesia
Czech Republic–Poland border crossings